IFC Films' first release was a drama in 1999, Spring Forward, directed by Tom Gilroy. Over 967 releases have followed, including:

2000s

2010s

2020s

Upcoming

Undated films

References

 
IFC Films